"There Will Come Soft Rains" is a lyric poem by Sara Teasdale published just after the start of the 1918 German Spring Offensive during World War I, and during the 1918 flu pandemic about nature's establishment of a new peaceful order that will be indifferent to the outcome of the war or mankind's extinction.  The work was first published in the July 1918 issue of Harper's Monthly Magazine, and later revised and provided with the subtitle "War Time" in her 1920 collection Flame and Shadow (see 1920 in poetry).  The "War Time" subtitle refers to several of her poems that contain "War Time" in their titles published during World War I, in particular to "Spring In War Time" that was published in her 1915 anthology Rivers to the Sea (see 1915 in poetry). The two poems, to the exclusion of all other of Teasdale works, appeared together in two World War I poetry anthologies, A Treasury of War Poetry: British and American Poems of the World War, 1914–1917 published in 1917, and Poems of the War and the Peace published in 1921.

Text
The original publication of "There Will Come Soft Rains" in Harper's Monthly Magazine does not contain the subtitle "War Time" that appears in the Flame and Shadow anthology, and "circling" in the second line was "calling" in the magazine. Quotation marks are included in the title, which is a stylistic convention used by the author that indicates the title is a phrase appearing in the first line of the poem.

"There Will Come Soft Rains"
(War Time)

There will come soft rains and the smell of the ground,
And swallows circling with their shimmering sound;

And frogs in the pools singing at night,
And wild plum-trees in tremulous white;

Robins will wear their feathery fire
Whistling their whims on a low fence-wire;

And not one will know of the war, not one
Will care at last when it is done.

Not one would mind, neither bird nor tree
If mankind perished utterly;

And Spring herself, when she woke at dawn,
Would scarcely know that we were gone.
The poem includes six stanzas, each made up of a rhyming couplet in irregular tetrameters.

Themes

Anti-war message 
In Flame and Shadow, "There Will Come Soft Rains" is the first of the six poems in section VIII that dwell on loss caused by war—all of which reflect pacifist sentiments.  The subtitle "(War Time)" of the poem, which appears in the Flame and Shadow version of the text, is a reference to Teasdale's poem "Spring In War Time" that was published in Rivers to the Sea about three years earlier.  "There Will Come Soft Rains" addresses four questions related to mankind's suffering caused by the devastation of World War I that appear in "Spring In War Time". The questions together ask how Nature can permit the Spring season to start while the war continues.

Spring in War Time

I feel the Spring far off, far off,
     The faint far scent of bud and leaf—
Oh how can Spring take heart to come
     To a world in grief,
        Deep grief?

The sun turns north, the days grow long,
     Later the evening star grows bright—
How can the daylight linger on
     For men to fight,
        Still fight?

The grass is waking in the ground,
     Soon it will rise and blow in waves—
How can it have the heart to sway
     Over the graves,
        New graves?

Under the boughs where lovers walked
     The apple-blooms will shed their breath—
But what of all the lovers now
     Parted by death,
        Gray Death?
"There Will Come Soft Rains" expresses an anti-war message in that Nature, as personified by Spring, ignores the four questions asked by the poet in "Spring In War Time" by awakening even as war may destroy any meaning for mankind's existence because such meaning, if it exists at all, only resides within mankind itself. In the poem, Nature proceeds indifferently to the outcome of war or human extinction as the personified Spring would "not mind" because Spring "would scarcely know that we were gone".

The "War Time" subtitle and battlefield imagery 
The Sedition Act of 1918 enacted two months before the original publication of "There Will Come Soft Rains" made it a criminal offense to "willfully utter, print, write, or publish any disloyal, profane, scurrilous, or abusive language about the form of the Government of the United States" and forced Teasdale to express her opposition to World War I "obliquely" in what might appear to be a pastoral poem. Flame and Shadow fell under the same regime of censorship since the Sedition Act was not repealed until December 13, 1920, but Teasdale revised her work to improve the chance that readers would perceive the implied battlefield imagery that, if made explicit, could have exposed her to criminal prosecution.

The "War Time" subtitle of "There Will Come Soft Rains", often omitted from copies and adaptations of the work, emphasizes the transition from what was in 1918, the most horrific event in human history, to some future peace.  The subtitle inserted for Flame and Shadow (published in 1920 after the end of World War I) has a dynamic effect on a work that otherwise could easily be interpreted as a static post-war construct. The dynamic setting is most easily seen from the viewpoint of a soldier or veteran with battlefield experience, though that view is not essential, as the replacement of brutal "wartime" imagery of World War I battlegrounds by the imagery for peace.  The literary device is through implicit contrast.  In particular, the imagery in the very first line is ambiguously peaceful and war-like with the latter connoting "soft rains" as miserable conditions for battles fought in mud, and "the smell of the ground" meaning the smell of spent weapons; phosgene, chlorine, or mustard gas (close to the ground); or the stench of rotting animal and human corpses.  In a combatant's view, the second line for the peaceful image of swallows "circling" (the other Flame and Shadow revision) in the sky replaces a wartime image of noisy military aircraft performing reconnaissance or dropping explosives on combatants below. "Pools" for frogs in the third line refers to standing water in flooded wartime trenches and the consequential misery of men living, fighting, sickening, and dying in them.  The profuse "white" tree blossoms in the fourth line are the white-out of losing consciousness after being struck by an explosive weapon. Robins that "wear feathery fire" in the fifth line are the wartime image of soldiers set ablaze by flamethrowers, an ancient weapon modernized for World War I. Finally, the carefree robins whistling on "a low fence-wire" in the sixth line replaces the wartime image of infantrymen entangled in barbed wire on a battlefield.

Influences 
Teasdale's point of view in "There Will Come Soft Rains" that the universe has no caring interest in the existence or any actions of human beings developed from her readings of the works of Charles Darwin, which began in earnest in 1913.  The same principle applies to all of the other living things mentioned in the poem.  Thus, given that swallows, frogs, and robins must kill other creatures to feed themselves, the serenity in the poetic settings for them symbolizes the absence in their natures of war that is in human nature and not an idyllic world without violence.

Adaptations 
Choral arrangements titled "There Will Be Soft Rains" that incorporate all or parts of Teasdale's poem as lyrics have been published by several composers and performed by numerous organizations.  Below is a listed composer, the choral voice and instrument accompaniment arrangement, publisher, and publication year.

 Laura Farnell, two-part treble voice with keyboard and three-part mixed choir (optional baritone) with piano, Carl Fischer, LLC (2008 and 2018, respectively)
 Tom Vignieri, SSSAA with string orchestra, (publisher unknown 2010)
 Ivo Antognini, SSAATTBB a cappella, JEHMS, Inc. (2012)
 Ruth Morris Gray, various and piano, Alfred Publishing (2013)
 Kevin Memley, SSAA with oboe and piano, Pavane Publishing (2014)
 Connor J. Koppin, SATB divisi a cappella, Santa Barbara Music Publishing (2016)
 Eriks Esenvalds, SSAATTBB a cappella, Music Baltica (2016)

A 1950 short story by Ray Bradbury shares the title and themes of the poem, and quotes it.

See also
The World Without Us
Life After People
Aftermath: Population Zero
 Zone Rouge: Former World War I battlefields reclaimed by nature

References

External links

1920 poems
American poems
Post-apocalyptic literature
Human extinction